The Boeing VC-25 is a military version of the Boeing 747 airliner, modified for presidential transport and commonly operated by the United States Air Force (USAF) as Air Force One, the call sign of any U.S. Air Force aircraft carrying the president of the United States.

Only two examples of this aircraft type are in service; they are highly modified Boeing 747-200Bs, designated VC-25A and having tail numbers 28000 and 29000. Although technically the Air Force One designation applies to the aircraft only while the president is on board, the term is commonly used to refer to the VC-25 in general. The two aircraft often operate in conjunction with Marine One helicopters, which ferry the president to airports whenever a vehicle motorcade would be inappropriate. Two new aircraft, based on the Boeing 747-8I and designated VC-25B, have been ordered by the USAF to replace the aging VC-25As.

Development

By 1985, the pair of Boeing 707-based VC-137s used as the presidential aircraft had been in service for 23 and 13 years respectively, and the USAF began searching for an eventual replacement. The Request for Proposal issued stated that the aircraft to be selected should have at least three engines and an unrefueled range of at least . Both Boeing with its 747 and McDonnell Douglas with the DC-10 were in competition to be selected, with the Boeing entry the eventual winner.  The fabrication of the current 747s began during the presidency of Ronald Reagan (1981–1989).

The VC-25s were completed in 1986 and first flew in 1987.  The interior designs were created by First Lady Nancy Reagan, who used designs reminiscent of the American Southwest. Problems with interior wiring for communication systems delayed delivery of the two aircraft until 1990, during the administration of George H. W. Bush.

The Air Force reported that the operating cost for each VC-25A in 2014 was $210,877 per hour.

Design and configuration

The VC-25 is capable of flying 7,800 miles (12,600 km)—roughly one-third the distance around the world—without refueling. The VC-25A can accommodate more than 70 passengers. Each VC-25A cost approximately $325 million. While the VC-25 has two main decks and a cargo area, like a regular Boeing 747, its 4,000 square feet (370 m2) of floor space has been reconfigured for presidential duties. Its lowest level is mostly cargo space, carrying luggage and the onboard food supply.

The main passenger area is on the second floor or main deck. There are three entrances on board, two on the main and one on the lower deck. Typically the president boards and disembarks from the front, main deck entrance via an airstair, while journalists and other passengers enter at the rear door of the main deck. Facilities for the press and other passengers are configured like an ordinary airliner's first-class cabin.

The "White House"
The front section of the aircraft is informally called the "White House", a reference to the president's official residence in Washington, D.C. The president's executive suite includes sleeping quarters with two couches that can be converted into beds, lavatory and shower, vanity, double sink, and a private office, or the president's "Oval Office aboard Air Force One". If necessary, the president can address the nation from the office. This capability was added after the September 11 attacks, during which the aircraft had to land at Barksdale Air Force Base for President George W. Bush to address the nation. These offices, including the president's suite, are mostly located on the starboard (right) side, and a long corridor runs along the port (left) side. The aircraft also contains a conference room, originally designed as a situation room, but now used for meeting with staff while traveling. This room includes a 50-inch plasma screen television which can be used for teleconferencing. The aircraft has fully equipped office areas with telecommunication systems (including 87 telephones and 19 televisions).

On board the VC-25 is a medical annex, which includes a fold-out operating table, emergency medical supplies, and a well-stocked pharmacy. George W. Bush had a treadmill added to Air Force One during his term in office. Every flight is staffed by a doctor and nurse. The aircraft is self-sufficient, such as carrying all the food it will need. Meals are prepared in two galleys, which together are equipped to feed up to 100 people at a time. The president gets a personal menu. An area where guests sit is near the center of the aircraft, outside the "White House".

There are separate quarters for guests, senior staff, Secret Service and security personnel, and the news media located in the aft area of the main deck. Protocol states that one may wander aft of one's assigned seat, but not forward of it. Communications equipment and the cockpit are on the upper deck. There are also secure and non-secure voice, fax and data communications facilities. While the aircraft's luggage capacity is adequate to carry the belongings of the passengers, the logistics train of the president means that the aircraft must fly preceded by an aerial convoy of several cargo transports, which carry the helicopters, motorcade vehicles, and other equipment required by the presidential entourage.

Operational history

VC-25A
The VC-25A replaced the VC-137C (a military version of the Boeing 707) as the mainstay of the Air Force One fleet. On some occasions, the VC-25s serve as transport for the US vice president, for which service they use the Air Force Two call sign. The VC-25A aircraft are maintained and operated as military operations by the Presidential Airlift Group, part of Air Mobility Command's 89th Airlift Wing, based at Joint Base Andrews in Camp Springs, Maryland.

The aircraft can also be operated as a military command center in the event of an incident such as a nuclear attack. Operational modifications include aerial refueling capability and countermeasures against anti-aircraft missiles. The electronics on board are connected with approximately 238 miles (383 km) of wiring, twice that of a regular 747. All wiring is covered with heavy shielding for protection from a nuclear electromagnetic pulse in the event of a nuclear attack. The aircraft also has electronic countermeasures (ECMs) to jam enemy radar, flares to avoid heat-seeking missiles, and chaff to avoid radar-guided missiles. All small arms and ammunition stores not in the physical possession of the Secret Service on board the VC-25s are stowed and secured by the Secret Service in separate locked compartments, each with a different locking mechanism for added security.  Many of the VC-25's other capabilities are classified for security reasons.

After a presidential inauguration resulting in a change in office, the outgoing president is provided transport on a VC-25 aircraft to their home destination.  The aircraft for this flight does not use the Air Force One call sign because it is not carrying the president in office.  For both Presidents Bill Clinton and George W. Bush, the flight was known as Special Air Mission 28000, where the number represents the aircraft's tail number.

The VC-25As have also been used to transport deceased former presidents, as the guest area aft of "the White House" has chairs and tables that can be removed and the casket laid in their place. The bodies of Ronald Reagan, Gerald Ford, and George H.W. Bush were transported to Washington for their state funerals, and then on to their final resting places. Colonel Mark Tillman, pilot for President George W. Bush, said, "We'll take care of the president from basically when he's in office to when he lays in state." For the funeral of President Ronald Reagan in 2004, Tillman said that the crew converted the front of the aircraft to look the way it would have appeared when Reagan was president; President and Nancy Reagan's Air Force One jackets were placed on the chairs to "make them feel at home". A specially designed hydraulic lifter (similar to the type used by airline catering) with the presidential seal affixed to the sides lifts the casket up to the portside aft door to enter the VC-25A. The tradition of placing the caskets in the passenger cabin dates back to the assassination of John F. Kennedy, when the crew did not want the president's body placed in the cargo hold, and again during the state funeral of Lyndon B. Johnson. The two VC-25As are slated for retirement by the end of 2025.

VC-25B

The VC-25A aircraft are aging and have become less cost-effective to operate. The USAF Air Mobility Command investigated possible replacements, with early press coverage suggesting that the USAF would consider the Boeing 747-8 and the Airbus A380. On 7 January 2009, Air Force Materiel Command issued a new Sources Sought notice for a replacement aircraft to enter service by 2017 with an additional two aircraft to follow in 2019 and 2021. On 28 January 2009, EADS North America representing EADS and its Airbus division confirmed it would not respond to the US Air Force notice, as assembling only three airplanes in the US would not make financial sense. This made Boeing the only aircraft manufacturer interested in supplying the replacement aircraft, and was reported to be exploring a 787 option also. On 28 January 2015, the Air Force announced the selection of the Boeing 747-8 to replace the aging VC-25A for presidential transport.

On 10 May 2016, the Air Force posted online an amendment to its Air Force One contract authorizing Boeing to begin preliminary design activities. This version of the contract synopsis confirmed that the government will buy two modified 747-8 aircraft. Boeing was awarded a contract in January 2016 to identify cost reduction opportunities in areas including maintenance, aerial refueling and communications. On 15 July 2016, Boeing received another contract for pre-engineering and manufacturing development (EMD) risk-reduction to address "system specification, the environmental control system, the aircraft interior, the electrical and power system and sustainment and maintenance approaches" to reduce development risks and life-cycle costs.

On 1 August 2017, Defense One reported that in an effort to pay less for the replacement program, the USAF entered into a contract to purchase two 747-8 Intercontinentals from Boeing, which had originally been ordered by Transaero, a Russian airline, in 2011. Before they could be delivered, the company filed for bankruptcy and was closed down; the two aircraft were stored at Southern California Logistics Airport in the Mojave desert to prevent corrosion. On 27 February 2018, the White House announced a US$3.9 billion agreement with Boeing to modify the two unsold 747-8s to replace the current VC-25As. The new aircraft will be designated VC-25B. These aircraft are to be retrofitted with telecommunications and security equipment to bring them to the required security level for the presidential aircraft, and are due to be delivered by 2024. Once the new aircraft are delivered, the VC-25As will be retired and placed in museums.

In June 2019, President Trump announced his plans to revamp the VC-25's livery from the traditional white and ultramarine shades to one of red, white, and blue. This would have been the first deviation from the Raymond Loewy livery scheme since it was introduced in 1962 on the VC-137C which was first used as Air Force One during the Kennedy administration. The Biden administration abandoned the new design, citing "additional engineering, as well as increased time and cost." A modified version of the traditional scheme was announced in March 2023.

The 747s begun undergoing modification work at the Boeing's San Antonio facility in 2020. According to The Wall Street Journal, the development process has been hit by multiple "production mishaps", including the discovery of empty tequila mini-bottles on one of the aircraft, and the use of jacks that were not rated to support the weight of the aircraft. While the jacking did not result in damage to the planes, "the Pentagon's contractor-management agency formally requested Boeing improve its operations." While the initial delivery date was set to 2024, the Pentagon expects the jets to be two to three years late.

In April 2022, Boeing's CEO Dave Calhoun revealed that he expects the company to have a loss of $660 million on the VC-25B program, after the contract was renegotiated by President Trump.

Variants

VC-25A based on Boeing 747-200B
VC-25B based on Boeing 747-8 Intercontinental, to replace the VC-25As

Operators

United States Air Force
89th Airlift Wing, Presidential Airlift Group (PAG) - Andrews AFB, Maryland

Specifications (VC-25A)

Notable appearances in media

The VC-25 "Air Force One" is a prominent symbol of the U.S. presidency and its powers; with the White House and presidential seal, it is among the most recognized presidential symbols. Air Force One has often appeared in popular culture and fiction, including the setting of the 1997 action movie Air Force One where the aircraft had an escape pod and a parachute ramp, unlike the actual presidential aircraft.

See also

References
Notes

Bibliography

 "VC-25 - Air Force One" Fact Sheet.  United States Air Force, 1 July 2003.
 Albertazzie, Ralph and Jerald F. Terhorst. Flying White House: The Story of Air Force One. Book Sales, 1979. .
 Braun, David. Q&A: U.S. Presidential Jet Air Force One.  National Geographic News, 29 May 2003.
 Dorr, Robert F. Air Force One. St. Paul, Minnesota: Motorbooks International, 2002. .
 Hardesty, Von. Air Force One: The Aircraft that Shaped the Modern Presidency. Chanhassen, Minnesota: Northword Press, 2003. .
 Harris, Tom. "How Air Force One Works".  HowStuffWorks.com. Retrieved: 10 October 2006.
 Jenkins, Dennis R. Boeing 747-100/200/300/SP (AirlinerTech Series, Vol. 6). North Branch, Minnesota: Specialty Press, 2000. .
 "Technical Order 00-105E-9, Segment 9, Chapter 7." 
 Walsh, Kenneth T. Air Force One: A History of the Presidents and Their Planes. New York: Hyperion, 2003. .

External links

 USAF VC-25 fact sheet
 USAF Photo gallery

C-025V, Boeing
Transportation of the president of the United States
Presidential aircraft
1980s United States special-purpose aircraft
Articles containing video clips
Aircraft first flown in 1987
VC-25
Double-deck aircraft